Poljska Ržana is a village in the municipality of Pirot, Serbia. According to the 2002 census, the village has a population of 1349 people.

There is a local football club in Poljska Rzana called Mladost.

References

Populated places in Pirot District